Olena Lymareva-Flink, (born June 3, 1992 in Severodonetsk) is a Ukrainian indoor volleyball player. She is a current member of the Terville-Florange Olympique Club in French Pro F-league.

Lymareva-Flink transfer from her home country Ukraine 2014 to Finland. She played two years with LP Viesti (LP Salo) and won one championships, one silver medal and two time Finnish Cup. She also played in 2014–15 CEV Women's Champions League on her first year in Finland.

2016-2017 she played first in Turkey for Kazan BS before entering A2-league in Italy for the rest of the season playing for Soverato. 2017-2018 season she spend again in Turkey, this time in Yesilyurt.

After finishing season Lymareva-Flink went to play in the Philippines for Petro Gazz Angels team at Philippines 2018 Premier Volleyball League Reinforced Conference.

2018-2019 season she played from December until the end of the season for her hometown team LP Viesti winning second Finish championship. After the season she went to represent again PVL-team at Philippines, this time PacificTown-Army Lady Troopers. They won bronze medals.

For the season 2019-2020 Lymareva-Flink moved to Hungarian Extraliga team Fatum-Nyíregyháza.

2020-2021 season Lymareva-Flink is playing in France, Terville-Florange OC.

She played mostly as outside spiker, but also as opposite.

Club 
  Severodonchanka (2006–2009)
  Regina (2009–2014)
  LP Viesti (2014-2016)
  Kazan BS (2016-2017)
  Volley Soverato (2017)
  Yesilyurt (2017-2018)
  Petro Gazz Angels (2018)
  LP Viesti (2018-2019)
  PacificTown-Army Lady Troopers (2019)
  Fatum-Nyíregyháza (2019-2020)
  Terville-Florange (2020-2021)

Awards

Individuals 
 Allstar player in Finnish league 2014-2015 (as opposite)
 Player of the Month in Finnish Mestaruusliiga
 Four times on All-Star of the Month in Finnish Mestaruusliiga

Clubs 
 Two times Ukrainian champion
 Two times Finnish champion 2015 and 2019, silver 2016
 Finnish cupchampion 2014, 2015
 PVL bronze 2019
 Hungarian cupsilver 2020

References

1992 births
Living people
People from Sievierodonetsk
Ukrainian women's volleyball players
Ukrainian expatriates in Finland
Sportspeople from Luhansk Oblast